Jack Reacher is a series of novels, novellas and short stories by British author Jim Grant under the pen name Lee Child. As of January, 2022, the series includes 26 books and a short story collection. The book series chronicles the adventures of Jack Reacher, former major in the United States Army Military Police Corps, as he roams the United States taking odd jobs and investigating suspicious and frequently dangerous situations. The Reacher series has maintained a schedule of one per year, except for 2010, when two were published.

The character has been portrayed by Tom Cruise in a 2012 film and 2016 sequel and Alan Ritchson in a streaming television series that premiered on Amazon Prime Video in 2022.

Most of the novels are set in the United States, in locales ranging from major metropolitan areas like New York City and Los Angeles to small towns in the Midwestern United States and the Southern United States. Reacher's travels outside the United States have taken him to rural England (The Hard Way, Maybe They Have a Tradition), London (Personal), Hamburg (Night School) and Paris (The Enemy, Personal).

Novel series

Short stories and novellas
Reacher has also appeared in several short stories by Child. "Second Son," "Deep Down" and "Not a Drill" were all released originally for the Amazon Kindle although "Second Son" was later included in the American & Canadian paperback and Kindle editions of The Affair, and "Deep Down" with the American & Canadian paperback and Kindle editions of A Wanted Man.  "High Heat" with the American paperback and Kindle editions of Never Go Back, "Everyone Talks" with the UK edition of Never Go Back, "Not a Drill" with the American paperback of Personal, and "The Fourth Man" with the Australian paperback of Past Tense.

"Second Son"
"Second Son" is a snapshot of the life of Reacher and his family circa 1974, while they are stationed on a military base in Okinawa. Upon arriving they immediately get into deep trouble that is compounded by some bad news. The action is interspersed with contemplative moments, such as when 13-year-old Jack's grandfather, a prosthetic-limb maker and World War I veteran in Paris, recounts that "… a great war leaves a country with three armies: an army of cripples, an army of mourners, and an army of thieves."

"Deep Down"
In 1986, summoned by military intelligence to Washington, DC, Reacher is sent undercover. The assignment that awaits him: the army is meeting with its Capitol Hill paymasters for classified talks on a new, state-of-the-art sniper rifle for US forces. But vital details about the weapon are leaking from someone at the top of the federal government and probably into the hands of unidentified foreign arms dealers. The prospect of any and every terrorist, mercenary, or dictator's militia getting their hands on the latest superior firepower is unthinkable. Reacher is tasked with infiltrating the top-secret proceedings and revealing the traitor. He targets a quartet of high-powered Army political liaison officers—all of them fast-track women on their way to the top. According to his bosses, it's a zero-danger mission, but Reacher knows that things are rarely what they seem.

"Guy Walks into a Bar"
The story is set in the moments before the beginning of the novel Gone Tomorrow.  Reacher, while at a blues music club, observes what he believes to be the beginning of a kidnapping as part of a Russian mafia dispute.  This story was published in The New York Times on 6 June 2009.

"James Penney's New Identity"
The story features Reacher, still in the Army as a captain, helping James Penney, a Vietnam War veteran who has recently been made redundant at work and had his car stolen.  When Penney unknowingly becomes a fugitive (after he accidentally burns down two neighbours' houses in the course of deliberately burning down his own in an act of frustration after being fired), Reacher helps Penney obtain a new identity so he can start a new life.  The story has appeared in Fresh Blood 3 (1999), an anthology of mystery short stories edited by Mike Ripley and Maxim Jakubowski, and in Thriller (2006), a short story anthology of thrillers written by International Thrillers, Inc. members and edited by James Patterson.

"High Heat"
This novella, published in 2013, opens on 13 July 1977  with an almost seventeen year old Reacher stopping by in New York in the middle of a heat wave to visit his brother at West Point when he encounters a woman (Jill Hemingway) being assaulted by a man. He drives off the man after a small scuffle, only to learn that the man is Croselli, one of the mob bosses of New York City. Croselli had slapped Hemingway for wearing a wire tape, and from this he deduced that Hemingway was an FBI agent. Hemingway warns him to leave the city before midnight or else Croselli would have his men kill him. They then part ways.

Reacher then meets a brunette, Chrissie at a coffee shop and they agree to go CBGB together using Chrissie's car. Inside the club they find Hemingway along with one of Croselli's henchmen, who promptly calls his boss on seeing Reacher. Meanwhile, Reacher gets to know that Jill Hemingway had been suspended from the FBI, pending review as part of the deal cut by Croselli with the FBI and that she was planning to bring him down. Reacher takes care of the henchman, just before a power outage strikes, before making his escape with Chrissie.

Chrissie and Reacher then make out in her car, when they encounter the Son of Sam, a serial killer who killed couples making out in cars. Son of Sam couldn't see Chrissie and leaves, but not before Reacher gets a good look at his posture and mannerisms.

Reacher and Chrissie then meet Hemingway outside Croselli's hideout. Hemingway informs Reacher that due to the outage, Croselli's men were out protecting various businesses that paid him money, from looters and plunderers, leaving Croselli alone in his warren. Chrissie and Reacher part ways and then Reacher breaks into the hideout to take care of Croselli but not before he gets him to profess his various crimes on tape. Reacher leaves Croselli tied to a chair with the tape at his feet and Hemingway calls in the FBI.

Hemingway also makes a call to the New York Police Department about the Son of Sam based on the description given to her by Reacher. They then go to a motel where Jill dies of a myocardial infarction. Reacher leaves the motel after informing the police of her death.

The story ends with the Son of Sam being apprehended 28 days after the outage.

This story was initially released exclusively in the eBook format.

"Everyone Talks"
A short story published as part of the UK hardback edition of Never Go Back, the story is told from the perspective of a female detective investigating an alleged shooting.  Reacher, while in the hospital, relates the events prior to the story beginning. This was also included in the June–July 2012 Esquire magazine. This story was also included as a small book with the Blu-ray release of the movie Jack Reacher: Never Go Back, released February 2017 in the US. The book is 5.5x6.75 inches, 10 pages long, with a few illustrations, some color, some black and white.

"Not a Drill"
Hitchhiking in Maine near the Canada–US border, Reacher is picked up by a trio of Canadians who claim to be outdoor enthusiasts. At the end of the road trip, Reacher parts ways with his companions and finds himself near a hiking trail sealed off by the US Army under mysterious circumstances. Reacher subsequently investigates the closure of the trail when one of the Canadians returns to seek his help.

"Good and Valuable Consideration"
This short story, co written by Lee Child and Joseph Finder, opens with Jack Reacher encountering two men, Nick Heller, a private spy and Jerry DeLong, a forensic accountant. Reacher and Heller soon find out that the chief enforcer for the Albanian mafia in Boston, Alex Dushku (also known as "Allie Boy"), will soon arrive to meet DeLong whom he is coercing into giving one of his enterprises a clean chit in a purported audit to be conducted by DeLong. Outside the bar, Reacher and Heller beat Dushku unconscious and steal his bribe money, which they then split between themselves before parting ways. DeLong, not having received the bribe money, is no longer under contractual obligation to carry out the subterfuge.

"Small Wars"
This story is set in 1989, when Jack Reacher is serving as an officer in the military police. A young lieutenant colonel in a stylish handmade uniform roars through the damp woods of Georgia in her new silver Porsche, until she meets a very tall soldier with a broken-down car.

"The Picture of the Lonely Diner"
This story takes place in Manhattan's Flatiron District. Jack Reacher has an unusual encounter in a diner reminiscent of the Edward Hopper painting "Nighthawks".  It was part of the Mystery Writers' Guild anthology Manhattan Mayhem edited by Mary Higgins Clark.

No Middle Name: The Complete Collected Short Stories
This anthology includes a novella, "Too Much Time", and the short stories"Deep Down", "Everyone Talks", "Guy Walks into a Bar", "High Heat", "James Penney's New Identity" (the original version which is longer), "Maybe They Have a Tradition", "No Room at the Motel", "Not a Drill", "Second Son", "Small Wars", and "The Picture of the Lonely Diner".

"Faking a Murderer"
Temperance Brennan is being investigated for the murder of a reporter who was re-opening an old suicide case that Reacher investigated.  Included in MatchUp, a collection of co-authored short stories by male and female thriller authors (Lee Child and Kathy Reichs).

"Too Much Time"
Reacher visits a hollowed-out town in Maine, where he witnesses a random bag-snatching but sees much more than a simple crime.

"The Christmas Scorpion"
On Christmas Eve, Jack Reacher stumbles into a no-name bar in the California desert.  The last thing he expects is a blizzard—or a visit from the world's deadliest assassin.

"The Fourth Man" 
Jack Reacher, ex-military drifter of no fixed abode, is stalked and tracked down by an FBI agent. She tells him that in a house raid in Sydney, Australian law enforcement found a list. There were four people on it, including him. The other three are dead. Hours later, Reacher is in the air, on his way to Sydney. What was the evil buried 25 years ago that has now resurfaced? Will Reacher be able to find the killers before they find him?

Other authors' works
Reacher is mentioned several times in the Stephen King novel Under the Dome, where he is described by the character Colonel Cox as "the toughest goddam Army cop that ever served, in my humble opinion." Lee Child's endorsement of Under the Dome appears on the cover of at least one edition of the book.

Similarly, The Jack Reacher Cases, a series of thus far 11 books, by Dan Ames, mentions Reacher's name on many occasions, but the character does not appear in person.
In the introduction to the short story "Good and Valuable Consideration," it is mentioned that while creating his "Nick Heller" series character, Joseph Finder borrowed many cues from the Jack Reacher series. The story is anthologized in the collection FaceOff, which pairs signature protagonists from two authors in co-written stories.

In-story chronology

 Second Son (short story, 2011)
 High Heat (novella, 2013)
 Deep Down (short story, 2012)
 Small Wars (short story, 2015)
 The Enemy (2004)
 James Penney's New Identity (1999 edited 2006)
 The Secret (forthcoming 2023)
 Night School (2016)
 The Affair (2011)
 Killing Floor (1997)
 Die Trying (1998)
 Tripwire (1999)
 The Visitor - aka Running Blind (2000)
 Echo Burning (2001)
 Without Fail (2002)
 Persuader (2003)
 One Shot (2005)
 The Hard Way (2006)
 Bad Luck and Trouble (2007)
 Nothing to Lose (2008)
 Guy Walks into a Bar... (2009)
 Gone Tomorrow (2009)
 61 Hours (2010)
 Worth Dying For (2010)
 Knowing you're Alive (with Dr. Morgan Snow) (2011)
 A Wanted Man (2012)
 Everyone Talks (2012)
 Never Go Back (2013)
 Not a Drill (2014)
 Personal (2014)
 Good and Valuable Consideration (with Nick Heller) (2014)
 No Room at the Motel (2014)
 The Picture of the Lonely Diner (2015)
 Make Me (2015)
 The Midnight Line (2017)
 Maybe they Have a Tradition (2016)
 Faking a Murderer (with Temperance Brennan) (2017)
 Too Much Time (2017)
 The Christmas Scorpion (2017)
 Past Tense (2018)
 The Fourth Man (2018)
 Cleaning the Gold (with Will Trent) (2019)
 Smile (2019)
 Blue Moon (2019)
 The Sentinel (2020)
 Better Off Dead (2021)
 No Plan B (2022)

Reception
The series has sold over 100 million copies worldwide.

Shared authorship
On January 18, 2020, Lee Child announced that his younger brother Andrew Grant would take over as writer of the Jack Reacher novels writing under the pen name of Andrew Child. The two brothers intend to write the next few novels together after which Andrew Grant will "strike out on his own".

The 25th novel in the series, The Sentinel, was published on 27 October 2020, and was the first Jack Reacher book to be co-authored by and credited to both Child brothers.

In other media
All of the Jack Reacher novels have been released in audio form in MP3 format. The most consistent narrator for these is Dick Hill.

Paramount Pictures hired Academy Award–nominated screenwriter Josh Olson to adapt One Shot, under the title Jack Reacher. Christopher McQuarrie, Oscar-winning screenwriter for The Usual Suspects, was then brought in to rewrite Olson's draft. It was announced in July 2011 that Tom Cruise—a 5'7" (1.70 m) actor—would play Reacher, who is 6'5" (1.96 m) in the books. Lee Child said, "Reacher's size in the books is a metaphor for an unstoppable force, which Cruise portrays in his own way."

It was announced in September 2014 that Tom Cruise would reprise the role in the sequel Jack Reacher: Never Go Back, which would adapt the 18th novel, Never Go Back. McQuarrie did not direct, due to a commitment with another Cruise film, Mission: Impossible – Rogue Nation, and was replaced with Edward Zwick. The film was released 21 October 2016.

On 14 November 2018, Child announced that he made a deal with Skydance Television and Paramount Television to produce a Jack Reacher series based on Child's novels. During this time, feature films production would be halted. He also stated that Cruise would not return to the role. He said he hoped the new actor would more properly represent Reacher. Paramount Television and Skydance Television are slated to produce the potential series. Child said of the recasting:

I really enjoyed working with Cruise. He's a really, really nice guy. We had a lot of fun. But ultimately the readers are right. The size of Reacher is really, really important and it's a big component of who he is...So what I've decided to do is – there won't be any more movies with Tom Cruise. Instead we're going to take it to Netflix or something like that. Long-form streaming television, with a completely new actor. We're rebooting and starting over and we're going to try and find the perfect guy.

On July 15, 2019, a TV series adaptation of the series under the name Reacher starring Alan Ritchson (6'2", or 188 cm) was announced by Amazon with showrunner Nick Santora, writing and producing the series through Paramount Television and Skydance Media. On January 14, 2020, the TV series was approved, with Child and Christopher McQuarrie executive producing the first season, which adapted the first novel in the series, Killing Floor. The series was released on February 4, 2022.

References

Book series introduced in 1997
Series of books
Jack Reacher